Mustafa Pektemek (born 11 August 1988) is a Turkish footballer who plays as a striker for Eyüpspor.

After breaking his leg at the start of the 2010–11 Süper Lig season, he scored on his first appearance back for Gençlerbirliği six months later, scoring in a 1–0 win against İstanbul Başakşehir. On 27 May 2011 Beşiktaş announced that Pektemek has been transferred from Gençlerbirliği for € four million.

During the first derby match on the second week of the 2012–13 season against rivals Galatasaray he suffered a knee injury, leaving the match immediately.

Career statistics
As of 25 May 2019.

International goals
Scores and results table. Turkey's goal tally first:

Honours
Beşiktaş J.K.
Süper Lig: 2015–16

References

External links
 Profile at TFF.org
 
 
 
 

1988 births
People from Akyazı
Living people
Turkish footballers
Turkey international footballers
Turkey under-21 international footballers
Turkey youth international footballers
Turkey B international footballers
Association football forwards
Sakaryaspor footballers
Sarıyer S.K. footballers
Gençlerbirliği S.K. footballers
Beşiktaş J.K. footballers
Kasımpaşa S.K. footballers
Kayserispor footballers
Eyüpspor footballers
Süper Lig players
TFF First League players